King Qing of Zhou, personal name Jī Rénchén, was the nineteenth king of the Chinese Zhou Dynasty and the seventh of the Eastern Zhou.

The son of King Xiang of Zhou, he became king in 618 BC after his father died.

King Qing had three sons, Princes Ban, Yu and Jizi. After King Qing died in 613 BC, Bān become King Kuang.

Family
Sons:
 Prince Ban (d. 607 BC), ruled as King Kuang of Zhou from 612 to 607 BC
 Prince Yu (d. 586 BC), ruled as King Ding of Zhou from 606 to 586 BC
 Prince Jizi (d. 544 BC), ruled the State of Liu (劉國) as Duke Kang of Liu (劉康公) from 592 to 544 BC

Ancestry

See also

Family tree of ancient Chinese emperors

References

External links 
壬臣姬

613 BC deaths
Zhou dynasty kings
7th-century BC Chinese monarchs
Year of birth unknown